Cabbage soup may refer to any of the variety of soups based on various cabbages, or on sauerkraut and known under different names in national cuisines. Often it is a vegetable soup. It may be prepared with different ingredients. Vegetarian cabbage soup may use mushroom stock.  Another variety is using a fish stock. Traditional cabbage soup is prepared using a pork stock.

In national cuisines 
Cabbage soup is popular in Russian,  Polish, Slovak and Ukrainian cuisine. It is also found in Czech ( or ), German ( or ), French cuisine, Finnish and Swedish cuisine.

The Swedish cabbage soup is usually made from white cabbage, which is browned before being boiled, and seasoned with generous amounts of allspice and sometimes served with boiled meatballs.

A variety of the soup called shchi is a national dish of Russia. While commonly it is made of  cabbages, dishes of the same name may be based on dock, spinach or nettle. The sauerkraut soup is called "sour ", as opposed to "fresh cabbage ".

In most of Latvia sauerkraut soup is made with sauerkraut, potatoes, carrots and groats, but the region in Latgale only sauerkraut and bacon is used.

Traditional kapuśniak preparation 
Drained and chopped sauerkraut is cooked in water with chopped pork, pieces of kielbasa and a bit of salt until the meat is almost tender. Instead of meat, a ready broth is also used. Afterwards, diced potatoes and carrots are added and boiled until they are cooked. Tomato paste and spices may be added. In some regions the soup is served with added flour and butter. A lean kapusniak is cooked with roots and fungi.

Kapuśniak is served hot, in some regions with sour cream and sprinkled with chopped parsley and dill.

In popular culture 
Louis de Funès was the protagonist of the French film La Soupe aux choux (Cabbage Soup).

Catherine the Great, a Russian tsarina of German origin, initially notorious at the Russian court for her poor command of Russian, was quipped to be capable of making seven misspellings in a two-letter word: a two-letter Russian word  would become  in German.

See also

 Cabbage soup diet, a fad diet involving heavy consumption of cabbage soup
 Cabbage stew
 Caldo gallego
 List of cabbage dishes
 List of soups
 List of vegetable soups
 Borscht
 Spinach soup
 Watercress soup

Sources 

 Клиновецька З. Страви й напитки на Україніі — Київ — Львів 1913 р.—С.4
 Кулинария, Государственное издательство торговой литературы — Москва 1959 г. — С.57
 Українські страви. К.:Державне видавництво технічної літератури УРСР. 1961. 454 с.

Polish soups
Ukrainian soups
Cabbage soups
Australian soups